Elisabeth "Lis" Beyer (1906-1973) was a German artist.

Biography 
Beyer was born in 1906 in Hamburg. She was a student at the Bauhaus where she was taught by Johannes Itten, Paul Klee, and Wassily Kandinsky. She worked at the Bauhaus weaving workshop with Georg Muche and Gunta Stölzl. She passed the Journeyman and Weaver examinations, and went on to teach weaving at the Maxschule in Würzburg.

Beyer was married to the artist Hans Volger (1904-1973) from 1932 until his death. They had two children. She died in 1973 in Süchteln.

References

See also
 Women of the Bauhaus

1906 births
1973 deaths
Artists from Hamburg
Textile designers
20th-century German women artists